Makat District is a district of Atyrau Region in Kazakhstan. The administrative center of the district is the urban-type settlement of Makat. Population:

References

Districts of Kazakhstan
Atyrau Region